The Evangelical Anglican Church of America (EACA) was a traditional and conservative Christian church headquartered in Brea, California. It was constituted in 1992 (incorporated in the State of California on 5 May 1993) in order to stand against the perceived apostasy of the Episcopal Church in matters of theology, liturgy and morality.

The founder of the church was the Reverend Samuel Paul Scheibler (born 1956), rector of St. Alban's Church in Brea, the EACA's only parish during most of the denomination's brief existence. He was consecrated as the presiding bishop for the denomination by the archbishop emeritus of the United Episcopal Church of North America, the Most Reverend Charles Doren (born 1915), and the Rt. Reverend Jurgen Bless, an Old Catholic bishop. Bishop Scheibler had been educated at Biola University in La Mirada, California, where he received his doctorate in missiology. Scheibler was previously the director of religion and culture at Claremont Graduate University's School of Religion.

Scheibler received a doctorate in missiology from Biola University in 1991. He was a bishop in the Evangelical Anglican Church of America, and was installed as rector of St. Edmund's Anglican Church in Elm Grove, Wisconsin after it left the Episcopal Church. The EACA effectively ceased to exist when Bishop Scheibler left California in 2003 and moved to Milwaukee, Wisconsin, where he held the Pieper Family Endowed Chair in Servant-Leadership and Distinguished Lecturer in General Studies at the Milwaukee School of Engineering.  

In early 2009 he became the rector of St. Edmund's Anglican Church, Elm Grove, Wisconsin, and he and that parish were received into the Convocation of Anglicans in North America (CANA). In 2012, the Episcopal Church won a judicial order to remove Reverend Samuel Scheibler and the parish from the property.

References

Anglicanism in the United States
Christian organizations established in 1993
Evangelical organizations established in the 20th century
Anglican organizations established in the 20th century
Evangelical churches in California
Churches in Orange County, California

External Links 
Youtube fact video